Malwai is a Punjabi dialect spoken in the Malwa region of Punjab. Major Malwai speaking centers are Ferozepur, Fazilka, Faridkot, Muktsar, Moga, Bathinda, Sangrur,Patiala,Barnala, Mansa districts and Jagraon, Raikot and Ludhiana (West) tehsils of Ludhiana district. In Pakistan, it is spoken in Vehari district of Punjab by the communities migrated from Indian Punjab after Partition 1947. Many Malwai speakers also live in Dabwali, Kalanwali and  Rania tehsils of Sirsa district of Haryana, India; the Jakhal and Ratia tehsils of Fatehabad district  of Haryana, India; and the  Sri Ganganagar and  Hanumangarh districts of Rajasthan, India. 

Although the characteristic distinction among the various dialects of Punjabi language lies in the speech pattern, the Malwai dialect most notably differs from the other dialects through its distinctive 'ū' (ਊ) sound in all future-tense verb endings.

Another notable difference is that where other Punjabi dialects have an 'L' sound, in Malwai many of those words are pronounced with an 'R' (ਰ) or 'ɭ̆' (ਲ਼) instead.
For example: 
             Majhi dialect  1(ghaddi khalarna), 2 (banda khalota). 
             Malwai dialect 1(ghaddi kharaona), 2 (banda kharota). 

The following peculiarities in vocabulary are also observed:

Also, in contrast with Majhi dialect, 'ਹ' is not tonal. Exceptions are encountered when 'ਹ'/'ہ' is not followed by a schwa ending or a vowel sound, as in, ਕਹਿਣਾ, ਰਹਿ, ਘਾਹ / ۔کہنا، رہِ، گھاہ

Notes

See also
 Punjabi dialects
 Languages of India
 List of Indian languages by total speakers
 List of Punjabi television channels

References 

Punjabi dialects
Languages of Punjab, India